The X-file scandal is a South Korean political scandal of 2005.  The scandal revolves around the release of wiretapped conversations to the media.  Many of the conversations were of conservative politicians in the Grand National Party arranging bribes during the South Korean presidential election of 1997.  The tapes were made illegally.  The scandal has recently broadened to look at the general role of the National Intelligence Service (NIS) in political and personal affairs.

In July, 2005, South Korean police raided the home of NIS intelligence operative Kong Un-young, retrieving 274 tapes.  Kong attempted suicide, but was unsuccessful. Because of this evidence of NIS involvement, some Grand National Party leaders charge that the administration of Roh Moo-hyun must have been aware of the wiretaps.  However, members of the pro-government Uri Party have charged that GNP leaders were also aware of them.

See also
Politics of South Korea

External links
Korea Times story of July 29 2005
Yonhap News Agency report

Politics of South Korea
Political scandals in South Korea
Espionage scandals and incidents
2005 in South Korea
2005 scandals
2005 in politics
National Intelligence Service (South Korea)